"Santiano" is a 1961 song, inspired by the sea shanty "Santianna", which uses the same tune. The song tells of a ship from Saint Malo bound to San Francisco, which is described as a place of great wealth. The French-language version was popularized first in the 1960s by Hugues Aufray.

Original version
In the early 1960s, the song was recorded in French by artist Hugues Aufray. It is by far the most well-known shanty in France and was released in 1961. The song's French lyrics were composed by the French writer Jacques Plante. The song was included on Aufray's 2007 compilation Les 50 plus belles chansons.

Star Academy France

In 2005, the song was covered by Star Academy 5 on the album Les Meilleurs Moments on which it features as the first track. Released on November 11, 2005 as the second single from the album, it achieved great success in France, where it topped the chart, as well as in Belgium (Wallonia). As of July 2014, it is the 87th best-selling single of the 21st century in France, with 325,000 units sold.

Track listings
 CD single
 "Santiano" — 2:39
 "Santiano" (instrumental) — 2:39

 Digital download
 "Santiano" — 2:39

Certifications and sales

Charts

Other versions
The Kingston Trio performed a cover of the song in 1958, under the title "Santy Anno”. This was the first recorded version with English lyrics, and tells a similar story about a California-bound ship departing from Liverpool. 

In 1961, American folk band The Highwaymen recorded their rendition of the English-language “Santiano". 

"Santiano" was covered by Laurent Voulzy in 2006. It features as 17th track on his studio album La Septième Vague. 

The "Oktoberklub", a folk-band from the GDR covered the song with unrelated lyrics under the title Da sind wir aber immer noch ("We're still here"), a pro-communist fight-song. 

In 2012, German band Santiano, named after Aufray's song, released another cover under the same title and with the same tune as the starting track of their first album. This version lives up to Aufray's appraisal of sailing, with mostly new lyrics.

In 2014, Belgian HandsUp producer DJ THT made a cover of "Santiano", featuring the vocals of Angel Lyne and released on Big Beef, a division of Tough Stuff Music.

In April 2021, British folk band The Longest Johns released a cover of “Santiano”, performed in collaboration with French neofolk band SKÁLD. This version is sung in both French and English.

References

1961 singles
2005 singles
French-language songs
French pop songs
SNEP Top Singles number-one singles
Star Academy France songs
1961 songs
The Kingston Trio songs
The Highwaymen (folk band) songs